Mešić is a Bosnian surname, a patronymic derived from the masculine given name Meša, itself a diminutive of Mehmed. It may refer to:

 Ademaga Mešić (1868—1945), Bosnian politician and military officer
 Elvis Mešić (born 1981), Bosnian footballer
 Kemal Mešić (born 1985), Bosnian athlete
 Mirnes Mešić (born 1978), Bosnian footballer
 Mirza Mešić (born 1980), Bosnian footballer

See also
Mesić (disambiguation)
Nešić

Bosnian surnames
Croatian surnames